"Roll in My Sweet Baby's Arms" is an American traditional song. It seems to have developed from lyrics in the cowboy song "My Lula Gal", itself a development of bawdy British and Appalachian songs generally known as "Bang Bang Rosie" or "Bang Away Lulu."

The Flatt & Scruggs version was first released as a single by Lester Flatt, Earl Scruggs and the Foggy Mountain Boys, on December 14, 1951. Buck Owens released his cover version "Rollin' in My Sweet Baby's Arms" in August 1971 as the second single from his album Ruby. The song peaked at No. 2 on the Billboard Hot Country Singles chart. It also reached number 1 on the RPM Country Tracks chart in Canada.

Versions
The earliest recorded version is that of Buster Carter and Preston Young, 1931, with Posey Rorer on fiddle.
Maury Finney's 1976 version peaked at No.  76 on the Billboard Hot Country Singles chart.

Chart performance

Buck Owens

Leon Russell (as Hank Wilson)

Maury Finney

References

1971 singles
1973 singles
Bill Monroe songs
Flatt and Scruggs songs
Roy Acuff songs
Boxcar Willie songs
Doc Watson songs
Dolly Parton songs
Glen Campbell songs
David Allan Coe songs
Rollin' in My Sweet Baby's Arms
Rollin' in My Sweet Baby's Arms
Willie Nelson songs
Capitol Records singles
Year of song unknown
Songwriter unknown